The Royal Wolverhampton NHS Trust (formerly Royal Wolverhampton Hospitals NHS Trust) runs New Cross Hospital and West Park Rehabilitation Hospital in Wolverhampton and Cannock Chase Hospital in Cannock.

In December 2020 it agreed to appoint a joint chair with Walsall Healthcare NHS Trust, anticipating plans to form a group model across the sustainability and transformation partnership.

Facilities
The New Cross Hospital Trust was established in 1994, covered Wolverhampton, the Black Country, South Staffordshire, North Worcestershire and Shropshire.

It also owns the former eye hospital building in Wolverhampton, which is now derelict.
In December 2013 it was announced that the Trust would be unable to achieve foundation status for at least six months after a Care Quality Commission inspection raised concerns about staffing levels. In March 2015 it abandoned plans to become a foundation trust.

In October 2014 it was announced that the Trust would take over Cannock Chase Hospital formerly run by Mid Staffordshire NHS Foundation Trust.

In February 2019 Dr Steve Field was appointed Chair of the trust.

In March 2020, Cannock Chase Hospital was forced to temporarily close down to assist Wolverhampton New Cross Hospital staff with the care of seriously ill patients.

Primary care

It took over three GP practices in Wolverhampton in April 2016 as a pilot scheme for vertically integrated care. The 12 GPs became employees of the trust. The practices: Alfred Squire Road Health Centre and Lea Road Medical Practice in Wolverhampton and the MGS Medical Practice in Bilston have 23,000 registered patients. In June 2017 it took over more practices bringing the total to 12 with 70,000 registered patients and 37 GP partners now employed by the trust.  In May 2022 it proposed to merge the 8 practices so there would only be one GMS contract.

It announced a partnership with Babylon Health in January 2020 to develop “digital-first integrated care”. The trust itself runs 10 GP practices. In April 2020 it made a deal with the company for citywide coverage of its new COVID-19 care assistant app, which will be available to 300,000 patients registered to Wolverhampton GPs, and all the trust staff. It agreed a new five-year deal with Babylon in August 2021 to use Babylon 360 to support patients at the trust’s nine GP practices. This is said to be an ‘integrated and accessible digital-first healthcare experience’.

Performance
The Trust was highlighted by NHS England as having 3 of 148 reported never events in the period from April to September 2013.

Mrs Sandra Haynes-Kirkbright was suspended by the Trust in July 2012 because of allegations made against her by colleagues of bullying, harassment, persistent swearing and unprofessional behaviour. She has alleged that the Trust cheated in concealing high mortality rates. Her whistle blowing allegations and subsequent treatment have been the subject of investigation by the NHS Trust Development Authority. She continues to be suspended on full pay. In May 2016 an independent review by Lucy Scott-Moncrieff into her case (http://www.verita.net/wp-content/uploads/2016/05/RWT-FINAL-21-Jan-16.pdf) ordered by Jeremy Hunt condemned the trust for its 'significantly flawed' and 'unfair' treatment of her.

The Greggs bakery shop at New Cross is said to be the firm's second busiest outlet - much busier than the cafe on the site which sells healthier food.

The trust was in dispute about £4 million funding for nurses with the Wolverhampton Clinical commissioning group which was subject to arbitration. The arbitration hearing sided in favour of the trust leaving it with £2 million to pay for seven-day working and supervisory ward nurses, and in favour of the CCG for 135 nurses employed to improve staffing on the wards, meaning £2 million was withdrawn. The trust decided in November 2017 that it would reduce the number of full-time equivalent band five registered nurses by 23.58 to a total of 507.85 and increase the number of band four care staff roles from 6 to 30.52 to reflect the addition of 24 nursing associate roles. The chief executive of the Royal College of Nursing said: “This is substitution. Our position is really clear that there may be a role for these staff but not as a substitute for nurses. The evidence is really clear about the risks to patients."

In December 2020, the Trust reported, that due to Covid, the number of patients presenting to A&E departments during that year was substantially lower than in 2019.

In May 2021, the chief executive of the Trust had to confirm a never before experienced and unexplained increase of attendance of walk-in patients at A&E departments throughout the trust which could delay the recovery to pre-Covid performance.

See also
 List of NHS trusts
 Healthcare in West Midlands

References

External links 

 Official website
 CQC inspection reports

NHS hospital trusts
Health in the West Midlands (county)